Schwaan is an Amt in the district of Rostock, in Mecklenburg-Vorpommern, Germany. The seat of the Amt is in Schwaan.

The Amt Schwaan consists of the following municipalities:
 Benitz
 Bröbberow
 Kassow
 Rukieten
 Schwaan
 Vorbeck
 Wiendorf

References

Ämter in Mecklenburg-Western Pomerania